Lal Dupatta is a 1948 Indian Hindi-language drama film directed by K. B. Lall and produced by Akash Chitra. Starring Madhubala, Rajan Haskar and D. K. Sapru, the film tells the story of Shobha, a headstrong village girl whose romance with a zamindar goes into awry due to some misunderstandings.

Lal Dupatta premiered in theatres on 10 December, 1948, and proved to be a commercial and critical success, with critics praising Madhubala's performance and Lall's direction. The success of Lal Dupatta marked a major turning point in the career of Madhubala. The film's print was lost by the studio just after few years of its release, making it a lost film.

Plot 
The film revolves around Kanwar, a young zamindar of Amirpur, who falls for a farmer's daughter named Shobha. When the Manager of Amirpur, who is a close relative of Kanwar and is jealous of his riches and property gets to learn this, he tries creating misunderstandings between Shobha and Kanwar. On the day of their marriage, the Manager gets Shobha's father murdered by his goons. Moreover, he declares Shobha as the illegitimate child of her father, and pays an old lady to act as her mother. Kanwar, on learning that Shobha is a "sin", throws her out of his house. She is now left with nothing to eat and nowhere to live. Other villagers refuse to provide her shelter and food.

Shobha, with the help of her friend Sukhiya manages to learn the truth of Manager. When she confronts him about this, he tries to molest her. She soon gets the grip of a gun and shoots him. As the film ends, she is seen standing happily on a hill with Kanwar, her red scarf "Lal Dupatta" flying and a sense of triumph on her face.

Cast 
The main cast of the film was:
Madhubala as Shobha
 Rajan Haskar as Kanwar
D.K. Sapru as Manager
 Ulhas as Mukhiya
 Ranjeet Kumari as Sukhiya
 Kesari as Sawan, one of Manager's goons
 Miss Gulzar as the lady who acts as Shobha's mother

Crew 
Dialogue: Manohar Khanna
Photography: Fali Mistry
Audiography: Moolgaavkar

Production 
The film was initially named Apna Raj but was renamed Lal Dupatta to make it seem a woman-centric film.

Soundtrack 
The soundtrack was composed by Gyan Dutt and D.N. Madhok, Shams Lakhnawi and Manohar Khanna wrote song's lyrics. "Jahan Koi Na Ho" was a popular song.

Release 
Lal Dupatta was initially released on 10 December 1948 at the Royal Opera in Bombay (today Mumbai).

Reception 
The film received positive reviews by critics. In Filmindia'''s review, Baburao Patel wrote, "K.B. Lall has given us a good picture. It is excellent in parts and good all around." Patel praised Madhubala highly for her performance. He stated that "Madhubala acquires a new screen personality [in the film] and  plays Shobha beautifully. She also proves herself at once competent and versatile in both light and pathetic sequences."

The film was a box office success and helped Madhubala in "attain[ing] stardom". The Indian Express said that her work in Lal Dupatta'' established her as a leading lady.

References

External links 

1948 films